Sir Walter Robert Haydon (29 May 1920–1 December 1999) always known as Robin, was a British former political aide, diplomat and ambassador who served as Downing Street Press Secretary under Edward Heath from 1973 to 1974.

Early life 
Robin Haydon was born in Wandsworth and educated at Dover Grammar School. He had hoped to follow in his father's (also called Walter) footsteps as a journalist, but at the outbreak of the World War II in 1939 he enlisted with the British army and would eventually be posted to India where he served behind enemy lines in Burma with V Force.

Career 
After the war in 1946 he joined the Foreign Service, and after a number of postings, including public relations officer to the British Mission to the United Nations in New York in 1961, he eventually became the British High Commissioner for Malawi (1971-1973) and then Malta (1974-1976), a position he relinquished when he was made British Ambassador to Ireland the day after the assignation of Christopher Ewart-Biggs in 1976. An attempt on his own life by the Provisional IRA took place in 1978 at Dublin Cathedral as he and his wife attended the Armistice Day service. 

He was appointed CMG in 1970. Robin Haydon retired from the Civil Service in 1980 and was knighted (KCMG) that same year. After retirement he took on public relations work with the Imperial Group, and later Imperial Tobacco, until 1987 and was a member of the Reviewing Committee on the Export of Works of Art, from 1984 to 1989.

Personal life 
In 1943, he married Joan Elizabeth Tewson, whom he had met while serving in India. The union bore two daughters and a son. He was widowed in 1988, and he died in 1999.

References 

1920 births
1999 deaths
Ambassadors of the United Kingdom to Ireland
Civil servants in the Cabinet Office
British Army personnel of World War II
Royal Artillery soldiers
People from the London Borough of Wandsworth
Civil servants in the Foreign Office
High Commissioners of the United Kingdom to Malawi
High Commissioners of the United Kingdom to Malta